The Slovakia men's national under-16 basketball team is a national basketball team of Slovakia, administered  by the Slovak Basketball Association. The team competes at the FIBA U16 European Championship in Division B.

FIBA U16 European Championship participations

See also
Slovakia men's national basketball team
Slovakia men's national under-18 basketball team
Slovakia women's national under-16 basketball team

References

External links
Official website 
Archived records of Slovakia team participations

Basketball in Slovakia
U
Men's national under-16 basketball teams